Neoserixia delicata is a species of beetle in the family Cerambycidae. It was described by Masaki Matsushita in 1933.

References

Saperdini
Beetles described in 1933